No Mercy Fool!/The Suicidal Family is a studio album by American crossover thrash band Suicidal Tendencies, released in 2010. It is considered the follow-up to 1993's Still Cyco After All These Years; like that album, it features some re-recorded songs of their early material. Aside from the re-recordings of songs from their 1987 Join the Army album, it also features re-recordings of No Mercy songs (including the previously released "Something Inside Me" and "No Mercy Fool!"), and the previously released "Come Alive" (from 2008's Year of the Cycos compilation album). Its cover art was created by designer Alan Pirie.

Suicidal Tendencies toured the US, on the "Join The Army / Déjà Vu 2010 US Tour" through October and November, in support of the album.

Track listing

Credits

Personnel 
 Mike Muir – lead vocals
 Dean Pleasants – lead guitar
 Mike Clark - rhythm guitar
 Steve Bruner – bass
 Eric Moore – drums

Additional personnel
 Mike Muir, Paul Northfield – production
 Paul Northfield – engineering
 Darian Rundall – recording (drums)
 Brian "Big Bass" Gardner – mastering
 Michael Seiff – artwork (original Suicidal Maniac art)
 Alan Pirie – artwork, design (cd design), layout
 Mathieu Bredeau – photography (band photos)
 Cyco Nation – management

References

External links
Suicidal Tendencies official website

Suicidal Tendencies albums
2010 compilation albums
Albums produced by Paul Northfield